Xiaopeng or variation, may refer to:

People
Xiaopeng (Hsiaopeng) is a Chinese male given name.
It may refer to:
 He Xiaopeng (born 1977) Chinese entrepreneur, founder of XPENG
 Li Xiaopeng (politician) (born 1959) Chinese businessman
 Li Xiaopeng (gymnast) (born 1981) Chinese gymnast
 Li Xiaopeng (footballer) (born 1975) Chinese soccer player
 Lu Xiaopeng (1920-2000) Chinese aircraft designer

Other uses
 Xiaopeng Motors (Xiǎopéng Qìchē), Chinese electric car company

See also

 Xiao (disambiguation)
 Peng (disambiguation)
 Li Xiaopeng (disambiguation)
 Xiaoping (disambiguation)
 Xiaopin (disambiguation)